Scunthorpe was a non-metropolitan district in Humberside, England. It was abolished on 1 April 1996 and replaced by North Lincolnshire.

Political control
Prior to 1974, Scunthorpe was a municipal borough within the administrative county of Lindsey. Under the Local Government Act 1972 it became a non-metropolitan district with borough status and was transferred to Humberside, with Humberside County Council providing county-level services. The first election to the reconstituted borough council was held in 1973, initially operating as a shadow authority before coming into its revised powers on 1 April 1974. Political control of the council from 1973 until its abolition in 1996 was always held by Labour:

Council elections
1973 Scunthorpe Borough Council election
1976 Scunthorpe Borough Council election (Borough boundary changes took place but the number of seats remained the same)
1979 Scunthorpe Borough Council election (New ward boundaries)
1980 Scunthorpe Borough Council election
1982 Scunthorpe Borough Council election
1983 Scunthorpe Borough Council election
1984 Scunthorpe Borough Council election
1986 Scunthorpe Borough Council election
1987 Scunthorpe Borough Council election
1988 Scunthorpe Borough Council election
1990 Scunthorpe Borough Council election
1991 Scunthorpe Borough Council election
1992 Scunthorpe Borough Council election

Borough result maps

By-election results

References

External links

 
Scunthorpe
Council elections in Humberside
District council elections in England